Jeffrey Turton (21 April 1912 — 1981) was an English professional footballer who played as a full back.

Career
Turton began his career at Chapeltown in 1933, signing for West Bromwich Albion the following year. In 1935, after failing to make any appearances for West Brom, Turton signed for Gillingham. Turton made 11 Football League appearances at Gillingham, signing for Crystal Palace in February 1936. At Crystal Palace, Turton made 12 league appearances over the course of two seasons, before signing for non-league side Folkestone in 1938. In 1939, Turton signed for Chelmsford City.

References

1912 births
1981 deaths
Association football defenders
English footballers
People from Wortley, Leeds
West Bromwich Albion F.C. players
Gillingham F.C. players
Crystal Palace F.C. players
Folkestone F.C. players
Chelmsford City F.C. players
English Football League players
Southern Football League players